Pedernales Airport  is an airport serving the village of Pedernales in the Delta Amacuro state of Venezuela.

Boats and the airport are the main access to Pedernales, which is on the estuary of the Caño Manamo River, and has no paved roads leading to it.

See also
Transport in Venezuela
List of airports in Venezuela

References

External links
OpenStreetMap - Pedernales
OurAirports - Pedernales
SkyVector - Pedernales

Airports in Venezuela